Rodolfo Filipe António Ricardo (born 20 June 1982 in Torres Vedras, Lisbon District), known simply as Rodolfo, is a Portuguese footballer who plays as a central defender.

External links

1982 births
Living people
People from Torres Vedras
Portuguese footballers
Association football defenders
Primeira Liga players
Liga Portugal 2 players
F.C. Alverca players
F.C. Barreirense players
Segunda División B players
Tercera División players
Real Balompédica Linense footballers
AD Cerro de Reyes players
Extremadura UD footballers
CD Badajoz players
Portuguese expatriate footballers
Expatriate footballers in Spain
Portuguese expatriate sportspeople in Spain
Sportspeople from Lisbon District